Albert Robinson may refer to:

Albert Alonzo Robinson (1844–1918), American civil engineer
 Albert H. Robinson (1881–1956), Canadian artist
 Albert Robinson (sprinter) (born 1964), American Olympic sprinter
 Albert Robinson (Australian politician) (1877–1943), Australian Senator and member of the South Australian House of Assembly
 Albert Robinson (Kentucky politician) (born 1938), American politician
 Albert Robinson (footballer, born 1948) (1948–1995), footballer for Chester City
 Albert Robinson (footballer, born 1913) (1913–?), English footballer for Mansfield Town
 Albert Robinson (priest) (1863–1948), British Anglican priest
 Al Robinson (1947–1974), American boxer